Waliszewo may refer to the following places:
Waliszewo, Greater Poland Voivodeship (west-central Poland)
Waliszewo, Sławno County in West Pomeranian Voivodeship (north-west Poland)
Waliszewo, Stargard County in West Pomeranian Voivodeship (north-west Poland)